Grandes Éxitos is the first greatest hits album recorded by Puerto Rican performer Chayanne. It was released by Sony Music on March 19, 2002 (see 2002 in music). In this album Chayanne featured three new songs, "Torero", "Y Tú Te Vas", and "Quisiera Ser" (as well as remixes of the songs "Salomé" and "Baila Baila", and a re-recorded version of "Fiesta En América"). The album peaked at #1 on Billboard's Hot Latin Albums, becoming his first album to reach #1 in that category, and #199 on the Billboard 200. A video, also titled Grandes éxitos was released in VHS and DVD featuring 13 videos of the singer.

Track listing

Charts

Year-end charts

Sales and certifications

References

2002 greatest hits albums
Chayanne compilation albums
Sony Discos compilation albums
Spanish-language compilation albums